Lakshman Namal Rajapaksa (born 10 April 1986; known as Namal Rajapaksa) is a Sri Lankan politician. He is the eldest of son of Sri Lankan former President and Prime Minister Mahinda Rajapaksa and a member of parliament. He was the Minister of Youth and Sports from 2020 to 2022.

Early life and family

Rajapaksa was born on 10 April 1986. He is the son of Mahinda Rajapaksa and Shiranthi (née Wickremesinghe). He has two younger brothers – Yoshitha and Rohitha. His paternal grandfather Don Alwin Rajapaksa was a member of parliament and Minister of Agriculture and Land in Wijeyananda Dahanayake's government.

Rajapaksa was educated at S. Thomas' College, Mount Lavinia, where he captained the school's 1st XV rugby team. After school Rajapaksa joined Cardiff University to study law. He then went to City University London from where he graduated in September 2009 with a third-class degree law degree.

Rajapaksa then joined Sri Lanka Law College to qualify as an attorney at law. He sat the college's preliminary exam in October 2009 and passed with second class honours. It was alleged that Rajapaksa sat the exam in a special cubicle that was set aside for him and the college's principal accompanied him.

In December 2010, several media sources reported that Rajapaksa had allegedly received preferential treatment during his final examination at Sri Lanka Law College. A fellow law student, Thushara Jayarathna, alleged that Rajapaksa had been given a separate room along with an internet enabled computer, later filing a complaint with the Law College examination system, Keselwaththa police station and the Supreme Court.

Media and NGO sources reports that Jayarathna's complaints were largely ignored or rejected, although he appeared before the college authorities early in January 2011. After the incident, sources reported that Jayarathna had been allegedly abducted and beaten up by the police, and that he also received multiple death threats traced to the police and the college.

According to the principal of the college, an investigation had been held but it concluded that the allegations "were based on hearsay" and "unfounded". Although the official investigation didn't find anything irregular, the threats against Jayarathna have not been investigated. The Colombo Telegraph reported that the consequences of Jayarathna's reporting wasn't unusual and that he is one of several others who have been harassed or persecuted after filing complaints against the ruling family or the police. Chief Justice Asoka de Silva also questioned the investigation, saying "We have only one Law College in Sri Lanka. If there are suspicions over its credibility, it will affect the whole profession."

Rajapaksa was sworn in as an attorney at law on 15 December 2011 in front of a panel of Supreme Court judges including Chief Justice Shirani Bandaranayake.

Involvement in murder and torture of Wasim Thajudeen

Wasim Thajudeen was a Sri Lankan rugby union player who played for Havelock Sports Club and the national team. Thajudeen was killed in a car crash on 17 May 2012 which was initially pronounced to be an accident but is currently being investigated as a murder. It has been reported that Namal Rajapaksa may be involved in the murder, due to Thajudeen having been in conflict with a 'young politician', likely Namal Rajapaksa, of the Rajapaksa administration over the acquisition of the Havelock Sports Club. There are also credible claims that rivalry over a woman prompted Namal Rajapaksa to order members of the Presidential Security Division (PSD) to abduct, torture and murder Thajudeen. Namal Rajapaksa has denied all allegations against him, enjoying the impunity granted by his father, Mahinda.

Sporting career
Rajapaksa played rugby for S. Thomas' College representing the school in all age groups - under 9s, 13s, 15s and 17s. In 2000 he led the Sri Lanka national under 16 team. Rajapaksa first played for the school's senior team in 2002 and captained the 1st XV team in 2005. He also led the Sri Lanka under 19 team in 2004.

When he joined Cardiff University he played in the university's rugby team from 2005 to 2006. He also played for City University London from 2006 to 2009. In 2009 he first played for the Navy SC, who he captained in 2010–11.  In 2010 Rajapaksa was invited to play for the Sri Lanka national rugby union team and in 2013 was appointed the team's captain, a position he retained until he retired from competitive rugby in July 2014.

Political career
Rajapaksa contested the 2010 parliamentary election as one of the United People's Freedom Alliance's candidates in Hambantota District and was elected to Parliament. Rajapaksa's father was an MP for Hambantota District for 16 years before becoming president in 2005. It is widely believed that Rajapaksa is being groomed to succeed his father. Rajapaksa is often seen at state events and is the chief guests at ceremonies inaugurating new roads, bridges, schools and other government buildings. Although Rajapaksa holds no government position, he has made numerous official foreign trips, sometimes accompanying his father. In January 2011 Rajapaksa led a parliamentary delegation to Libya and met with Muammar Gaddafi. Rajapaksa has also made official trips to United Nations Headquarters (September 2010), Nepal (March 2011), Palestine (February 2012), Japan (March 2012), South Korea (April 2012), US (May 2012), China (May 2013) and Australia (June 2013). Rajapaksa also led Hambantota's unsuccessful bid to host the 2018 Commonwealth Games. Rajapaksa was a key figure of his father's unsuccessful 2015 presidential campaign. He was accused by many for his father's downfall and the misuse of public funds.

Business career
Carlton Sports Network, a sports, lifestyles and business television channel, is owned by Rajapaksa and his brother Yoshitha. Rajapaksa was a shareholder in Ascot Holdings PLC – as at 30 September 2011 he owned 92,000 shares (1.15%) in the company. Sri Lanka's new government in 2015 has slapped a one-time tax of LKR 1 billion on the only sports television channel in the country, which is part-owned by Namal Rajapaksa, saying that the sports channel has not paid a single penny to the government, since its inception. It has been alleged that CSN was favoured by the Rajapaksa regime which awarded it the exclusive broadcast rights of several sports fixtures including cricket. Cricket broadcast rights had been the monopoly of state TV Rupavahini until the advent of CSN. The Rajapaksa government headed by Namal's father had transferred the sports broadcast rights to CSN by a cabinet decision with no open tender or any known competitive bidding process. After Rajapaksa's defeat in the January 2015 presidential election the new government of President Maithripala Sirisena launched a probe into the rights deal.

Namal Rajapaksa is being investigated for money laundering after a civil group named Voice Against Corruption lodged a complaint against him to the FCID. According to the complaint, a company owned by MP Namal Rajapaksa had purchased shares of another company using money obtained through methods violating the Money Laundering Act. As a result, Colombo Chief Magistrate ordered several bank accounts related to the companies to be frozen for further investigation.

In August 2016 an arrest warrant was issued through the Interpol on Oranella Iresha Silva who is a suspect in an inquiry conducted under the Money Laundering Act for purchasing Rs. 100 mn worth shares of a company named Hellocorp using allegedly ill-gotten funds by Namal's Gowers Corporation.
The controversial air hostess named Nithya Senani Samaranayake of the SriLankan Airlines was also arrested and remanded in August 2016 for her role in NR Consultations and Gowers Corporation as a director. She was released from the airline at the request of the then Secretary to the President Lalith Weeratunga to handle Namal Rajapaksa's "special projects" but continued to receive her basic salary as well as a "productivity allowance" in addition to other perks and promotions. She was paid approximately Rs. 70,500 per month by the Airline while another approximate Rs. 87,500 were paid by the Presidential Secretariat. However, when inquired she was unable to describe the exact location where she worked except a place in Temple Trees and not the Presidential Secretariat. Further she was not able to recollect the names of any officials in the Temple trees or the Presidential Secretariat except one and no "special projects" were identified where she was attached to. On October 10, 2017, Iresha Silva who was hiding in Dubai was arrested at the Katunayake Airport by the CID.

Tharunyata Hetak
Namal Rajapaksa and his brother Yoshitha started Tharunyata Hetak (A Tomorrow for Youth), a youth organisation, in 2005. Rajapaksa is chairman of Tharunyata Hetak, Yoshitha is vice-chairman. According to Transparency International Sri Lanka (TISL) Tharunyata Hetak spent Rs. 172 million promoting Rajapaksa's father and his party during the 2010 presidential and parliamentary elections. Tharunyata Hetak receives significant funding from public bodies including the Bank of Ceylon and National Lotteries Board both of which were under the control of Rajapaksa's father.

Namal Rajapaksa was arrested by the Financial Criminal Investigations Department (FCID) on July 11, 2016, on charges of money-laundering. This was in relation to the misuse of Rs 70 million that was given to him by an Indian real estate company in return for giving them premium land from the heart of Colombo CBD. According to his allies, the money was intended to be used for a rugby tournament but they have failed to prove how it was used. Rajapaksa allies claim the arrest as a politically motivated, but has no proof of how he earn the assets. The case is still pending.

He was arrested on October 10, 2017 by the Hambantota Police with two other MP's for charges of unlawful assembly, causing damage to public property, injuring police officers, obstructing their duty and violating a court order.

Personal life 
Namal married Limini Weerasinghe on 12 September 2019 at Gangaramaya Temple. They have a son born in 2020.

See also
List of political families in Sri Lanka

References

External links
 The Rajapaksa Ancestry
 Tharunyata Hetak

Living people
1986 births
Namal
Sri Lankan Buddhists
Sinhalese lawyers
Sinhalese politicians
Sri Lanka Freedom Party politicians
United People's Freedom Alliance politicians
Sri Lankan rugby union players
Alumni of City, University of London
Alumni of Sri Lanka Law College
Alumni of S. Thomas' College, Mount Lavinia
Members of the 14th Parliament of Sri Lanka
Members of the 15th Parliament of Sri Lanka
Members of the 16th Parliament of Sri Lanka
Sri Lanka Podujana Peramuna politicians